Ksar El Hirane is a district in Laghouat Province, Algeria. It was named after its capital, Ksar El Hirane.

Municipalities
The district is further divided into 2 municipalities:

Ksar El Hirane
Bennasser Benchohra

References

Districts of Laghouat Province